Bunnyman 2 (known as The Bunnyman Resurrection in the UK) is a 2014 American slasher film and is a sequel to Bunnyman. The plot revolves around a psychopath who dresses in a bunny suit and typically uses a chainsaw to murder people along with his family.

Sequel
The third film in the series is titled Bunnyman Vengeance which was released on October 20, 2017, on video on demand and November 21, 2017, on Blu-ray and DVD.

References

External links

American slasher films
American serial killer films
2014 horror films
2010s slasher films
2010s English-language films
2010s American films